Khanai railway station was a railway station located in Balochistan, Pakistan.

See also
 List of railway stations in Pakistan
 Pakistan Railways

References

Railway stations on Zhob Valley Railway Line